Cathy Ann Palumbo Bencivengo (born August 24, 1958) is a United States district judge of the United States District Court for the Southern District of California.

Early life and education 

Bencivengo was born Cathy Ann Palumbo in Teaneck, New Jersey. Bencivengo earned a Bachelor of Arts degree in 1980 from Rutgers University and a Master of Arts degree in 1981 from Rutgers. She then earned a Juris Doctor in 1988 from University of Michigan Law School.

Professional career 
In 1988, Bencivengo joined a predecessor to the law firm DLA Piper as an associate and became a partner in 1996. She remained with DLA Piper until 2005, when the judges on the United States District Court for the Southern District of California selected Bencivengo to be a United States magistrate judge.

Federal judicial service 
On May 11, 2011, President Barack Obama nominated Bencivengo to a seat on the United States District Court for the Southern District of California, to replace Judge Jeffrey T. Miller, who assumed senior status in June 2010. She was confirmed by the Senate on February 9, 2012 by a 90–6 vote. She received her commission on February 10, 2012.

References

External links

1958 births
American women lawyers
American lawyers
Judges of the United States District Court for the Southern District of California
Living people
New Jersey lawyers
People from Teaneck, New Jersey
Rutgers University alumni
United States district court judges appointed by Barack Obama
21st-century American judges
United States magistrate judges
University of Michigan Law School alumni
American people of Italian descent
21st-century American women judges